Karl Heider may refer to:

 Karl G. Heider (born 1935), American visual anthropologist
 Karl Heider (zoologist) (1856–1935), Austrian zoologist and embryologist